Virendra Singh (Lokayukta)  was appointed lokayukta of Uttar Pradesh on 16 December 2015 by Supreme Court of India He is first Lokayukta of India who is appointed by Supreme Court of India. He is successor of Justice N.K. Mehrotra
The Supreme Court exercises its right under Article 142 of the Constitution to make the appointment of Lokayukta .

Personal life
1977:Legal Practice start and selection in PCS (J)
1985:Promoted as Civil Judge.
2005 :District Judge-Maharajganj, Banda, Balia, Mathura
2009:High Court-Justice (13 April 2009)
2011 :Retirement (13 January 2011)
2011 :Chairman of State Consumer Commission of UP

Seventh Lokayukta 
 Justice Vishwambhar Dayal (14 September 1977----)
Justice Mirza Mohammad Murtaza Husain
 Justice Kailash Nath Goyal
 Justice Justice Rajeshwar Singh 
 Justice Sudhir Chandra Verma
 Justice N.K.Mehrotra
 Justice Virendra Singh (20 December 2015-----)

Swearing postponed
After the intervention of the Supreme Court, Virendra's appointed was replaced by retired judge Sanjay Mishra after the state government was accused of concealing facts regarding the appointed and objections raised by chief justice of Allahabad High Court.

References

Living people
Ombudsmen in India
20th-century Indian judges
1949 births
Judges of the Allahabad High Court